Hunter Payton Mendoza (born October 4, 2004, in West Hills, California) is an American actor known for his roles in the NBC TV Series A to Z and Criminal Minds.

Early life
He was born and raised in Los Angeles, California. In an interview with Naluda Magazine he said that he began acting when he was six years old and he referred to himself as "half hispanic".

Career 
Payton Mendoza works as an actor and known for his roles in the NBC TV Series A to Z, Criminal Minds and in the made-for-TV movie The Joneses Unplugged. In 2015 he played the role of Sullivan in the science fiction television movie "Ominous".

In 2017, Payton was nominated for a Young Entertainer Award and he won A Young Artist Award for Best Performance In A Digital TV Series or Film, Young Actor, for his role as "Young Doug" in Who's Driving Doug. In 2022 he played the character of Ryder in the comedy feature film "A Genie’s Tail".

Filmography

References

External links
Hunter Payton at the 2018 Young Entertainer Awards
Good Morning LALA Land Hunter Payton Interview 2019

2004 births
People from West Hills, Los Angeles
American male child actors
21st-century American male actors
Living people